Love FM 98.9 (DWKE 98.9 MHz) is an FM station owned and operated by Kaissar Broadcasting Network. Its studios and transmitter are located at Brgy. Danlagan, Lopez, Quezon.

References

External links
Love FM FB Page
Love FM Website

Radio stations in Lucena, Philippines
Radio stations established in 2012